James Derick Kirkland is an American professional boxer who held the regional WBO–NABO junior middleweight title in 2008. He was one of boxing's most prominent junior middleweight prospects in the late 2000s and early 2010s, until an 18-month prison stint set his career back significantly. Nicknamed the "Mandingo Warrior", Kirkland is known for being a highly aggressive southpaw pressure fighter with formidable punching power, having scored 88% of his victories via knockout.

Amateur career
Kirkland has an amateur record of 134–12 and won the Silver Gloves championship four years in a row and lost on a controversial decision to James Patterson in the finals of the National Golden Gloves.

Instead of going to the Olympics, Kirkland turned professional to provide for his family.

Professional career
Kirkland turned professional in August 2001 in San Antonio, Texas. In his debut Kirkland defeated fellow debutant Maurice Chalmers with a third-round knockout. Kirkland has been trained by former women's champion Ann Wolfe since 2001. On November 22, 2008, Kirkland (24–0, 21 KOs) won an 8th round technical knockout versus Brian Vera (16–2, 10 KOs). Kirkland dropped Vera twice in Round 2. On March 7, 2009, Kirkland defeated Joel Julio on HBO's Boxing After Dark at the HP Pavilion in San Jose by TKO after Round 6.

Return to boxing 
On March 5, 2011, Kirkland returned to the ring after an almost 2-year layoff to defeat Ahsandi Gibbs via first-round KO. Two weeks later he stopped Jhon Berrio by 2nd round TKO. Just 3 weeks after that, on April 9, 2011, Kirkland faced Nobuhiro Ishida of Japan, in what was supposed to be a stay-busy fight for Kirkland. However, in a stunning upset, the previously undefeated Kirkland was stopped in the first round by the Japanese fighter, who isn't known for being a big puncher having only 7 KO's in 29 fights, getting knocked down 3 times. After the loss, Kirkland split with trainer Kenny Adams and reunited with Ann Wolfe. Kirkland and Wolfe had broken up after Kirkland went to prison.

Kirkland came back from his first-round knockout loss to score three knockdowns over Alexis Hloros en route to a second-round knockout. He entered the fight his usual aggression, looking to mix it up immediately and scored two knockdowns in the opening round. First, Hloros went down during a flurry and then he took a knee during another stream of punches.

Kirkland vs. Angulo
On November 5, 2011, in a highly exciting fight, Kirkland rose from a first round knockdown to defeat Angulo via 6th-round TKO.

In addition to his aforementioned victories over Angulo, Kirkland's other notable wins have been against Brian Vera (TKO8), who just lost a controversial decision to Julio César Chávez Jr., Joel Julio (TKO6) and Eromosele Albert (TKO1).

On October 16, 2013, it was announced that Kirkland, has signed with promoter/rap star 50 Cent and his company SMS Promotions and has his next fight lined up.

On December 7, 2013, Kirkland continued his winning ways with a sixth-round TKO of 23-year-old prospect Glen Tapia at the Boardwalk Hall in Atlantic City. In the article, Kirkland was described as 'potentially, the most dominant offensive force in boxing since a prime Mike Tyson'.

Kirkland vs. Álvarez
Kirkland fought former Super Welterweight Champion Canelo Álvarez after his decision victory over Erislandy Lara on July 12. The fight took place on May 9 at Minute Maid Park in Houston, Texas with Kirkland losing by KO in 3rd round.

Professional boxing record

Outside the ring
As of 2009, Kirkland was on probation for an armed robbery conviction in 2003, for which he spent 30 months in prison.

On Sunday, April 19, 2009, Kirkland was stopped in Austin traffic and arrested for possession of a firearm by a felon. On Wednesday, September 23, 2009, Kirkland was sentenced to 24 months in prison after pleading guilty to the firearm charge.   Kirkland was released from prison in September 2010 and spent several more months in a halfway house in Austin, Texas.

In June 2013, Kirkland was arrested for assault causing bodily injury and family violence. In 2016 he was again arrested, this time for failing to pay child support.

References

External links

Year of birth missing (living people)
Date of birth missing (living people)
Living people
Sportspeople from Austin, Texas
Boxers from Texas
American male boxers
Southpaw boxers
Light-middleweight boxers